Vultures is the third extended play from Disciple. They released the EP on September 25, 2015, independently.

Background 
While working on the album Attack, the band wrote many songs, including the six songs on this EP. They did not include these songs on the album, claiming that they did not thematically complement the album.

In an interview, lead singer Kevin Young stated that the song "Bring the Dead to Life" was written by Jason Wilkes. The story behind the song was that Wilkes' friend saw his former band's deceased drummer, Scotty Lockridge, in her dream. Wilkes went on to write this song, dedicating it to Lockridge.

Critical reception

Awarding the EP four and a half stars for New Release Today, Mary Nikkel states, "Vultures is set apart from the spiritually empowering fight songs found on Attack by its brooding edge, drawing out the midnights of the soul in order to declare the presence of Christ's grace in even the darkest moments." Christopher Smith, giving the EP four stars at Jesus Freak Hideout, writes, "Like Attack, all the elements that make a high caliber rock album are present on Vultures." Rating the EP a 4.8 out of five from The Christian Beat, Chris Major says, "Vultures is as well-produced as any other Disciple record and perfectly complements their iconic collection." Stephanie Crail, rating the album a 94 percent for Jesus Wired, says, "Vultures is yet another remarkable album in an already impressive career, and only serves as further proof that Disciple is well deserving of their place in the realm of Christian rock."

Track listing

Charts

References

2015 EPs
Disciple (band) albums